A number of motor vessels have been named Buccaneer, including:

, a Norwegian merchant ship in service 1937–42
, a tug captured by Somali pirates in 2009

Ship names